James Fanchone (born 21 February 1980) is a retired French professional footballer who played as a striker.

Career
Fanchone was born in Le Mans.

On 23 June 2011, he moved to Ligue 2 club Le Havre for an undisclosed fee.

External links
 Profile at Soccerway
 Career Stats at lfp.fr

1980 births
Living people
Footballers from Le Mans
Association football midfielders
French footballers
French people of Guadeloupean descent
Le Mans FC players
RC Strasbourg Alsace players
FC Lorient players
Le Havre AC players
Ligue 1 players
Ligue 2 players